The national flag of Burkina Faso is formed by two equal horizontal bands of red (top) and green, with a yellow five-pointed star resting in the center. The flag was adopted on 4 August 1984.  The flag uses the Pan-African colours of Ethiopia, reflecting both a break with the country's colonial past and its unity with other African ex-colonies. The red is also said to symbolize the revolution and the green the abundance of agricultural and natural riches. The yellow star placed over the red and green stripes represents the guiding light of the revolution. The flag was adopted following the coup of 1983 which brought Thomas Sankara to power.

History
The original flag of Upper Volta, adopted at independence, contained three horizontal stripes of black, white, and red. These colours represented the three major tributaries of the Volta River, which flows south through the country: the Black Volta, the White Volta and the Red Volta. It is identical to the tricolor flag used by the German Empire from 1871 to 1918. The flag was changed when Upper Volta became Burkina Faso on 4 August 1984.

Construction Sheet

Colour scheme
The exact color shades are not defined by law, but are listed as "green", "red" and "yellow-gold" in the constitution. Approximations are listed below:

Historical flags

Other flags

Gallery

See also 
 Coat of arms of Burkina Faso
 Pan-African colours

References

External links

Burkina Faso
Flag
Flags of Africa
Burkina Faso